Rhotekin is a protein that in humans is encoded by the RTKN gene.

This gene encodes a scaffold protein that interacts with GTP-bound Rho proteins. Binding of this protein inhibits the GTPase activity of Rho proteins. This protein may interfere with the conversion of active, GTP-bound Rho to the inactive GDP-bound form by RhoGAP. Rho proteins regulate many important cellular processes, including cytokinesis, transcription, smooth muscle contraction, cell growth and transformation. Dysregulation of the Rho signal transduction pathway has been implicated in many forms of cancer. Alternative splicing results in multiple transcript variants encoding different isoforms.

References

Further reading